Grand Hotel station, MP 41.4 of the Ulster and Delaware Railroad, was located in the small mountain hamlet of Highmount, New York, at the summit between Big Indian and Arkville.  A turntable was located here, allowing pusher engines to be turned before descending to Arkville or Big Indian.

History
It served as a stop for the Grand Hotel and the Highmount post office. It was extremely busy until the New York Central Railroad ended Oneonta to Kingston passenger service on the line, on March 31, 1954. It was left to fall apart, become an eyesore, and was soon demolished.

References

External links
 Delaware and Ulster Railroad
 Catskill Mountain Railroad

Railway stations in the Catskill Mountains
Railway stations in Ulster County, New York
Former Ulster and Delaware Railroad stations
Former railway stations in New York (state)
Railway stations closed in 1954